The 2009 flu pandemic was a global outbreak of a new strain of influenza A virus subtype H1N1, first identified in April 2009, termed Pandemic H1N1/09 virus by the World Health Organization (WHO) and colloquially called swine flu. The outbreak was first observed in Mexico, and quickly spread globally. On 11 June 2009, WHO declared the outbreak to be a pandemic. The overwhelming majority of patients experience mild symptoms", but some persons are in higher risk groups, such as those with asthma, diabetes, obesity, heart disease, or who are pregnant or have a weakened immune system. In the rare severe cases, around 3–5 days after symptoms manifest, the person's condition declines quickly, often to the point respiratory failure.

The virus reached Turkey in May 2009. A U.S. citizen, flying from the United States via Amsterdam was found to have the swine flu after arriving at Istanbul's Atatürk International Airport. Turkey is the 17th country in Europe and the 36th country in the world to report an incident of swine flu.

The Turkish Government has taken measures at the international airports, using thermal imaging cameras to check passengers coming from international destinations.

The first case of person to person transmission within Turkey was announced on 26 July 2009.

On 2 November, the Turkish Health Ministry began administering vaccines against H1N1 influenza, starting with health workers.

After a slow start, the virus spread rapidly in Turkey and the number of cases reached 12,316. First death confirmed on 24 October and death toll reached 627.

Timeline

See also
 GISAID the Global Initiative on Sharing Avian Influenza Data (also covers novel A/H1N1 swine flu)

References

External links

 

Official status reports
 H1N1 outbreak status report, at the European CDC
 Swine influenza updates, at the World Health Organization
 
Background information
 WHO's Pandemic Influenza Phases
 Influenza Research Database – Database of influenza genomic sequences and related information.
 Medical Encyclopedia Medline Plus: Swine Flu
 Medical Encyclopedia WebMD: Swine Flu Centre

Swine flu outbreak
Turkey
Health in Turkey
Health disasters in Turkey
2009 disasters in Turkey